Chak in Iran may refer to:
 Chak, Gilan (چاك - Chāk)
 Chak, South Khorasan (چك - Chak')